The olivaceous piha (Snowornis cryptolophus) is a species of bird in the family Cotingidae. It is found in Colombia, Ecuador, and Peru.  In regard to population density and range this species is not considered vulnerable.

Habitat
Its natural habitat is subtropical or tropical moist montane forests.

References

olivaceous piha
Birds of the Colombian Andes
Birds of the Ecuadorian Andes
Birds of the Peruvian Andes
olivaceous piha
olivaceous piha
olivaceous piha
Taxonomy articles created by Polbot